Kanshino is a rural locality (a village) in Saminskoye Rural Settlement, Vytegorsky District, Vologda Oblast, Russia. The population was 22 as of 2002.

Geography 
Kanshino is located 48 km north of Vytegra (the district's administrative centre) by road. Oktyabrsky is the nearest rural locality.

References 

Rural localities in Vytegorsky District